The buff-breasted earthcreeper (Upucerthia validirostris) is a species of bird in the family Furnariidae. It is found throughout the Puna grassland and mountains of northwestern Argentina.

Its natural habitats are subtropical or tropical high-altitude shrubland and subtropical or tropical high-altitude grassland.
It has been lumped together with the plain-breasted earthcreeper based on song, continuous song, duet, and call.

References

buff-breasted earthcreeper
Birds of Argentina
Birds of the Puna grassland
buff-breasted earthcreeper
Taxonomy articles created by Polbot
Taxa named by Hermann Burmeister